Myetlone Mhar Alwan Nhotekhan Mhar Marna is a 2019 Burmese drama television series. It aired on MRTV-4, from May 9 to June 17, 2019, on Mondays to Fridays at 19:00 for 28 episodes.

Cast

Main
 Aung Min Khant as Aung Mhann
 Nay Chi Shoon Lak as Hnin Nway
 Htet Myat as Ko Nyunt Aye 
 Wyne Shwe Yi as Swe Swe Kyaw, wife of Ko Nyunt Aye

Supporting
 Kaung Sett Naing as Ko Than Lwin
 Phyo Yazar Naing as Mg Myint
 Zin Wine as U Kyaw Dunn, father of Swe Swe Kyaw
 Nyi Nanda as U Aung Baw
 Great Chan as Nwe Nwe, elder sister of Hnin Nway
 Phyo Than Thar Cho as Wutyi
 Khine Hnin Wai as Daw Hnin Yee, mother of Hnin Nway
 Pwint Nadi Maung as wife of U Aung Baw
 Goon Pone Gyi as Daw Gyi Tin

References

Burmese television series
MRTV (TV network) original programming